Love's Awakening may refer to:
 Love's Awakening (1953 film), a West German drama film
 Love's Awakening (1936 film), a German drama film